Colin Wratten is a British television producer. He has produced episodes of BBC dramas Killing Eve, One of Us, The Musketeers, Inside Men and Waking the Dead, as well as BBC television film The Turn of the Screw and episodes of BBC soap EastEnders. He also produced the ITV mini-series A Mother's Son. Wratten produced the mini-series The Witness for the Prosecution, based on an Agatha Christie's novel, which was nominated for a BAFTA award.

References

External links

Year of birth missing (living people)
Living people
British television producers
BBC television producers
Place of birth missing (living people)